Panighatta, or Panighata (English translation: Water mill), is a Tea Estate village on the banks of Balason River and the foothills of the Himalayan Mountains. Panighatta falls under the Mirik sub-division of Darjeeling district and is situated about 26 kilometers from Mirik and 32 km from Siliguri in the state of West Bengal in India.

Geography

Location

Area overview
The map alongside shows a part of the southern portion of the Darjeeling Himalayan hill region  in the Darjeeling district. In the Darjeeling Sadar subdivision 61.00% of the total population lives in the rural areas and 39.00% of the population lives in the urban areas. In the Mirik subdivision 80.11% of the total population lives in the rural areas and 19.89% lives in the urban areas. There are 78 tea gardens/ estates (the figure varies slightly according to different sources), in the district, producing and largely exporting Darjeeling tea. It engages a large proportion of the population directly/ indirectly. Some tea gardens were identified in the 2011 census as census towns or villages. Such places are marked in the map as CT (census town) or R (rural/ urban centre). Specific tea estate pages are marked TE.

Note: The map alongside presents some of the notable locations in the subdivision. All places marked in the map are linked in the larger full screen map.

Demographics
According to the 2011 Census of India, Panighata had a total population of 5,235 of which 2,595 (50%) were males and 2,640 (50%) were females. There were 438 persons in the age range of 0 to 6 years. The total number of literate people in Panighata was 3,588 (68.54% of the population over 6 years).

Languages spoken 
Nepali and Hindi.

Tea  

Panighatta Tea Estate employs about 750 permanent and 400 casual staff. The estate is spread over 900 acres and produces about 5.5 lakh kg tea annually.

Transport

Notable persons 
Rangu Souriya

Education
Loreto School Panighatta is an English-medium coeducational institution established in 1995. It has facilities for teaching from nursery to class X. It is affiliated with the West Bengal Board of Secondary Education.

Rainbow High School is an English-medium coeducational institution established in 1980. It has facilities for teaching from class Nursery to class X. It has 20 computers, a library with 1,000 books and a playground.

External links

References 

Economy of Darjeeling district
Tea estates in West Bengal
Villages in Darjeeling district